Jacobaea gibbosa is a species (synonym Senecio gibbosus) of the genus Jacobaea and the family Asteraceae.

References

External links

gibbosa